The Toreck is a mountain in Bavaria, Germany, the east top of the Obere Gottesackerwände.

Mountains of Bavaria